Rising Auto (Chinese: 飞凡汽车, Feifan Auto) is electric vehicle brand by Chinese automobile manufacturer SAIC Motor.

History
Rising Auto was originally the R Brand in 2020, an offshoot of SAIC's Roewe brand dedicated to new energy vehicles and intelligent vehicles. The Chinese Feifan name came out shortly after in October 2021, and the English Rising Auto name was created in 2021 to give the R brand a full meaningful name. Early products are rebadged Roewes with the R7 crossover being the first original product. The following product is the F7 compact executive sedan.

Production models
Rising Auto currently produces the following models:

 Rising Auto ER6 (production from 2020), an electric compact car based on the Roewe i6.
 Rising Auto F7 (production from 2022), an electric compact executive car.
 Rising Auto Marvel R (production from 2020), an electric compact crossover SUV based on the Roewe Marvel X.
 Rising Auto R7, a mid-size crossover SUV previewed by the ES33 Concept.

Concept vehicles
Rising Auto has revealed the following concept cars:

References

SAIC Motor
Vehicle manufacturing companies established in 2021
Electric vehicle manufacturers of China